Teenui-Kurukava, is a village on Atiu in the Cook Islands.

The village of Teenui has a population of 107. Enua Airport and Atiu Harbour are located in the village. Teenui also contains one of the largest churches in the Cook Islands, Cook Islands Christian Church.

References 

Populated places in the Cook Islands
Atiu